Several ships of the Swedish Navy have been named HSwMS Småland, named after the Småland province:

 Småland (1680) was a ship of the line launched in 1680 as Drottning Hedvig Eleonora and renamed Sverige in 1694 and Småland the same year
  was a ship of the line launched in 1688, renamed Wenden in 1694 and sunk in 1734
  was a galley launched in 1749
  was a  launched in 1952 and decommissioned in 1984

Swedish Navy ship names